Niasse is a surname. Notable people with the surname include:

Babacar Niasse (born 1996), Senegalese footballer
Ibrahima Niasse (born 1988), Senegalese footballer
Moustapha Niasse (born 1939), Senegalese politician and diplomat
Oumar Niasse (born 1990), Senegalese footballer
Ahmed Khalifa Niasse (born 1946), Senegalese politician and religious leader